"Beautiful" is a song by Spanish singer Enrique Iglesias from his tenth studio album, Sex and Love. It features Australian recording artist Kylie Minogue and was also on her Kiss Me Once album. "Beautiful" was written by Iglesias, Mark Taylor, Alex Smith, and Samuel Preston, and it was produced by Taylor and Smith. The song was released as promotional single in Australia and New Zealand  on 14 March 2014.

Track listing
Digital download
"Beautiful" – 3:25

Charts

Release history

References

2014 singles
2014 songs
2010s ballads
Vocal duets
Male–female vocal duets
Enrique Iglesias songs
Kylie Minogue songs
Songs written by Enrique Iglesias
Universal Republic Records singles
Songs written by Preston (singer)
Songs written by Mark Taylor (record producer)